The 1947 Kansas Jayhawks football team was an American football team that represented the University of Kansas in the Big Six Conference during the 1947 college football season. In its second and final season under head coach George Sauer, the team compiled an 8–1–2 record (4–0–1 against conference opponents), tied for the conference championship, was ranked No. 12 in the final AP Poll, and outscored opponents by a combined total of 304 to 102. The team was undefeated in the regular season before losing to Georgia Tech in the 1948 Orange Bowl.

On October 11, 1947, the Jayhawks scored 86 points against South Dakota State which remains the highest point total in the history of the program.

Halfback Ray Evans was selected by the Associated Press and Grantland Rice as a first-team player on the 1947 All-America team. He was later inducted into the College Football Hall of Fame. Four Kansas players received first-team honors from the United Press on the 1947 All-Big Six Conference football team: Evans; end Otto Schnellbacher; guard Don Fambrough; and halfback Forrest Griffith.

The team played its home games at Memorial Stadium in Lawrence, Kansas.

The Jayhawks were Big 6 co-champions.

Schedule

References

Kansas
Kansas Jayhawks football seasons
Big Eight Conference football champion seasons
Kansas Jayhawks football